Royal Moroccan Swimming Federation (FRMN) is the national federation which oversees aquatic sports in Morocco. FRMN oversees competition within Morocco in swimming, diving, water polo, synchronized swimming, and open water swimming. It was founded in 1956 and is currently based in Casablanca, Morocco.

FRMN is affiliated to:
CNOM, the Moroccan National Olympic Committee (Comité National Olympique Marocain).
FINA, the International Swimming Federation,
CANA, the African Swimming Confederation.

See also
List of Moroccan records in swimming

References

External links
 

Swimming